Queen Margaret College is an independent girls’ school in Wellington, New Zealand, providing education for students from Year 1 to 13 with a co-educational Pre-School. It was established in 1919 as an inner-city, Presbyterian girls’ college.

Curriculum
Queen Margaret College offers the International Baccalaureate. The school is the largest, independent girls’ school in Wellington and the only girls’ school in the lower North Island offering a dual qualification pathway of either the internationally recognised IB Diploma or New Zealand's credential, The National Certificate of Education (NCEA).

Extra-curricular

The students have numerous opportunities for involvement, high-level performance and leadership through sporting and cultural activities and extensive exchange programmes with sister schools. The college has over 100 sports teams participating in a wide range of sports. There are options for social and competitive levels. Students can join a number of musical groups and participate in the Sheilah Winn Shakespeare Festival, debating, theatre-sports and the annual joint musical production with Scots College. Queen Margaret College also has an extensive exchange programme with sister schools from Chile, Tahiti, France, Australia, China, Europe, US and Japan encouraging language development and global citizenship.

Facilities

Queen Margaret College is located in a Category 2 historical building constructed in 1876. The Tower Block is located at the centre of the school learning environment. The Hobson Complex was opened in 2013 which includes a purpose-built gym and fitness room. The school also has an auditorium for music and performances. A new purpose-built co-educational pre-school was opened in 2015. In 2018, the Queen Margaret boarding house was established, capable of housing 40 students.

History

Queen Margaret College was founded on its present site in Hobson Street, Thorndon, in 1919 as an independent girls' school by the Hon John Aitken and The Very Rev. Dr. James Gibb. Its general aim as stated in the first prospectus was "to provide for girls a sound intellectual and moral education, and to build up strong Christian character on board religious basis, and thus to develop the best type of girlhood and womanhood". The buildings had been used by Scots College from 1916 to 1918.

The School's namesake is Queen Margaret, who was married to King Malcolm. He features in Macbeth, being one of Duncan's sons, who flees after his father was murdered.

Students are organised into five houses – Berwick (blue & silver), Braemar (blue & yellow), Glamis (red & blue), Lochleven (red, green and black), and Stirling (black & yellow). They are named after castles in Scotland, a nod towards the Scottish heritage upon which the school was built.

Queen Margaret College is the sister school of Scots College, and the colleges annually celebrate Founders' Day together. The college also has links with the international body of Margaret Schools and Independent Schools of New Zealand.

The Queen Margaret College Tower Building is registered by Heritage New Zealand as a Category II structure, with registration number 1419. The Queen Margaret College building was originally designed and erected for T.C. Williams and his wife Anne Beetham as their family homestead in Hobson St., Thorndon, New Zealand. T.C. Williams was the son of Henry Williams (missionary) who translated the Treaty of Waitangi into Māori.

Notable old girls

 Hilary Barry, 1980–1987, journalist and television personality
 Kirsty Gunn, novelist and writer of short stories
 Stella Maxwell, fashion model
Antonia Prebble, 1999–2001, actress
 Helen Small, 1970–1982, English Literature professor at Oxford University
 Ruby Tew 2008–2011, Olympic rower
 Shirley Smith, lawyer
 Betty Loughhead JP MBE first NZer to be appointed President of Soroptimist International

References

Further reading

External links

 Official website
 School history

Educational institutions established in 1919
Girls' schools in New Zealand
Presbyterian schools in New Zealand
Secondary schools in the Wellington Region
Schools in Wellington City
1919 establishments in New Zealand
Alliance of Girls' Schools Australasia